Doctor Doom is a fictional supervillain appearing in American comic books published by Marvel Comics. Since his debut in The Fantastic Four #5 (July 1962), the character has become the archenemy of the Fantastic Four, and has been included in almost every media adaptation of the Fantastic Four franchise, including film, television, and computer and video games. Usually depicted as the Monarch of the fictional nation Latveria, Doctor Doom has often been featured as an antagonist of other superheroes as well, including Black Panther, Doctor Strange, the X-Men and the Avengers.

Television

1960s
Doctor Doom's appears in The Marvel Super Heroes (1966), voiced by Henry Ramer.
Doctor Doom appears in Fantastic Four (1967), voiced by Joseph Sirola.

1970s
Doctor Doom appears in The New Fantastic Four (1978), voiced by John Stephenson.

1980s
Doctor Doom appears in Spider-Man (1981), voiced by Ralph James with heavy modulation akin to Darth Vader. The latter five episodes, written by Larry Parr, comprised a complete story arc about rebels in Latveria trying to topple Doom. Throughout these episodes Doom is able to trick people, especially J. Jonah Jameson, into thinking that he is a kind ruler and international humanitarian.
Doctor Doom appears in the Spider-Man and His Amazing Friends episode "The Fantastic Mr. Frump", voiced by Shepard Menken.

1990s
Doctor Doom appears in Fantastic Four (1994), voiced by John Vernon in the episode "The Mask of Doom: Part 1", Neil Ross in the remainder of season one and Simon Templeman in season two. In the three-part episode "The Mask of Doom", he captured the Fantastic Four and forced them to go back in time and obtain an object for him. In the episode "The Silver Surfer & the Return of Galactus", he steals Silver Surfer's powers but is tricked by the Fantastic Four to follow them to outer space, and due to Galactus' decree that Silver Surfer may not surf the cosmos ever again, is thwarted by the planet devourer himself and the Power Cosmic is returned to the Silver Surfer. In the episode "And a Blind Man Shall Lead Them", he struck at a powerless FF and had his hands crushed by the Thing. In the episode "Nightmare in Green", he directed Hulk to attack the team. In the series finale "Doomsday", he again acquired the Power Cosmic, and once again he is tricked into going to outer space, only to hit the barrier that prevents Silver Surfer from leaving Earth.
Doctor Doom appears in The Incredible Hulk (1996), voiced again by Simon Templeman. In the episode "Doomed", he  sends a group of robots to capture Bruce Banner in Washington, D.C., and ends up capturing his cousin Jennifer Walters when Banner transforms into the Hulk to lure him to his U.S. estate. Walters is seriously injured, and Doom attaches her to a bomb force Hulk to obey him. It is revealed the U.N. Security Council has accused Doom of war crimes an has issued a petition for his surrender. Doctor Doom responds by holding Washington, D.C. captive, enveloping the city in a force field, and demands the U.S. end all hostile actions towards him and Latveria or he will unleash the Hulk into the city. When the U.S. President refuses his demands, Doom fulfils his threat and sends Hulk to destroy the United States Capitol. Unbeknownst to Doctor Doom, Banner had performed a blood transfusion to save Jennifer's life that transforms her into She-Hulk, who convinces Hulk to return and defeat Doom. In the episode "Hollywood Rocks", Doctor Doom returns to take revenge on Banner and She-Hulk and reclaim his title of Monarch of Latveria, which he was deposed of by U.N. occupying forces. He captures both Hulk and She-Hulk, steals Banner's asteroid repelling beam generator and alters it into a tractor beam, threatening to use it for destruction if the U.N. does not return him control of Latveria. Doom then places Hulk into a capsule and uses the beam to launch it into space heading straight into the sun. She-Hulk manages to escape and attempts to use the tractor beam to bring Hulk back to Earth, but Doom destroys it before she is able to fully do this and escapes in his jet. Hulk, however, manages to reach an asteroid heading back to Earth and crash lands into the ocean, where he is rescued by She-Hulk.
Doctor Doom appears in the three-part "Secret Wars" episode of Spider-Man, voiced by Tom Kane. He is one of Earth's villains teleported to an alien planet by the Beyonder as part of his test of good versus evil, and uses alien technology to turn part of the planet into "New Latveria" after overthrowing Doctor Octopus's Octavia. However, he did not use his ruling powers to oppress and allowed the aliens in his country to live in peace and harmony, protecting them from the other villains. He even kidnapped Thing only to cure him of his deformity, turning him back to Ben Grimm, and then restored his own scarred face as an afterthought. With Ben's cooperation, he learns of the purpose they were brought to the alien planet, and manages to acquire the powers of the Beyonder by absorbing him with a weapon he created. With this newfound power, Doom sends the other villains back to Earth and attempts to kill the other superheroes by throwing a mountain at them when they decide to oppose him. However, he proves unable to control the power fully, his nightmares and subconscious fears spawning monsters that constantly attack New Latveria. The Thing turns Doctor Doom's weapon on him, and the Beyonder's powers are returned to the mystic figure himself. The Beyonder then returns Doctor Doom to Earth with no memory of these events (as well as presumably his scarred face), along with all the other superheroes apart from Spider-Man, to whom he reveals he allowed Doom to steal his powers to test him for an upcoming conflict.

2000s

Doctor Doom appears in Fantastic Four: World's Greatest Heroes, voiced by Paul Dobson. Similar to his 2005 film counterpart, this version  sponsored the space mission that was bombarded with cosmic rays, leading to the creation of the Fantastic Four and his own transformation into Doctor Doom; and like his movie version, he wears a large green coat and Adamantium body armour as opposed to a traditional cloak. In the pilot "Doomsday", Doom fabricates records of Reed Richards deliberately exposing his teammates to cosmic rays to alienate and capture him, subsequently using Richards' own invention to harness the energy from the Negative Zone and unleash the creatures that reside in it upon New York, which he acknowledged would have potentially killed millions. In "Doomed", Doom switches bodies with Richards and he attempts to destroy Reed's reputation by overloading the Baxter Building's power supply, destroying it and several city blocks as well. In the episode, more is revealed about Dr. Doom's life and ruling attitude, as Reed tells Doom that his insecurity, in particular about his personal appearance, is his greatest adversary. In "Bait and Switch", Doom uses a device to reach into the Negative Zone to latch onto an unknown object of great power and steal it from the other dimension, which causes cosmic energy bursts to happen everywhere in the city and indirectly switches the powers of the Fantastic Four. In "Annihilation", Dr. Doom forms an alliance with Annihilus to capture the four, only to betray the creature after stealing his Cosmic Control Rod from the Negative Zone. Bringing the Rod back to Earth, Doom attempts to use it to dominate the world, only to be foiled by the Fantastic Four and Annihilus himself. In "Strings", the Fantastic Four are framed for being a danger to the city by the Puppet Master. Not knowing the culprit behind their misfortunes, the Four split up to question their enemies. When the Thing approaches and accuses Dr. Doom, the angered villain orders his Doombots to blast him out of his embassy. In "Doomsday Plus One", Doom launches the Baxter Building into space, hoping to leave the Fantastic Four to die in orbit. In "Out of Time", Doom warns his past self of future events via time travel, causing the younger Victor to abrupt the space launch so that the Fantastic Four never existed. With no heroes to stand in his way, Doom succeeds in taking over the world. However, this is reversed when the Fantastic Four reset the timeline. In "Shell Games", Dr. Doom combines a variation of Iron Man's armor with his own, becoming a near unstoppable force. However, he is ultimately defeated by the combined efforts of the Fantastic Four and Iron Man. In the episode "Doom's Word is Law", Dr. Doom constructs a Doombot with artificial intelligence, but it ultimately defects to the Fantastic Four after learning of its master's evil ways.
Doctor Doom appears in The Super Hero Squad Show, voiced by Charlie Adler. In the first season, he is after the Infinity Sword and enlists a number of villains to help him obtain it, with MODOK and Abomination as his primary henchmen. He is defeated and sent to prison at the end of the first season. In the second season, he escapes prison and plots to obtain the Infinity Sword and the Infinity Stones, serving mainly as a secondary villain before being captured and imprisoned once again in the series finale.

2010s
Doctor Doom appears in Iron Man: Armored Adventures, voiced by Christopher Britton. This version is a member of the royal family of Latveria, and the accident that scarred him also killed his family. In the episode "The Might of Doom", Doctor Doom travels to New York to meet with Obadiah Stane to obtain Iron Man's armor specifications from stolen files, and in return improve Stane's "Monger Core" generator. After the retrieval of the specs occurred, Doom fought Iron Man and put him into a three-hour deep sleep using a magical attack, also beating War Machine. After the core was modified, Doom betrays Stane and activates a timer that will first have the core generator absorb all the energy in New York then expel it in one enormous blast. Iron Man, however, is able to contain the blast, angering Doom. War Machine intercepts Doom's plane to which he responds by nearly defeating the two armored heroes in a two-on-one battle. As Doom states he was prepared to invoke Dormammu's magic to defeat Iron Man, Nick Fury and S.H.I.E.L.D. arrive, end the fight, and escort Doom back to Latveria as he vows to fight Iron Man again. As Doctor Doom returns to Latveria, Fury states to Iron Man that they had been keeping an eye on Doom even though he has diplomatic immunity and then states they'll be there when he missteps. At the end of the episode Tony and Pepper Potts learn that Doom's armor was based on Makluan technology. In the episode "Doomsday", Doctor Doom finds the temple of the 9th Makluan Ring and manages to defeat its guardian Grey Gargoyle just as Mandarin and Howard Stark arrive searching for the ring. Doom captures both and takes them back to his castle, and uses the 9th Makluan Ring to cause strange phenomena around the world. Mandarin manages to escape and recruits Iron Man for help. They arrive at Doom's castle, escape a death trap and finally encounter Doom. They combine their powers and apparently defeat Doom, which turns out to be a Doombot with a fake Makluan Ring. Upon finding a secret chamber in the castle, they find Howard in a cube cell only to be attacked and imprisoned by the real Doctor Doom. Doom reveals that he has used the 9th Makluan Ring, which can create portals between dimensions, to summon the demon Yogthul to make a deal and give him "three pure souls" (Iron Man, Mandarin and Howard) in exchange to be reunited with his deceased family. Yogthul, however, declares that Mandarin is not a pure soul and ends up rescinding his deal with Doctor Doom. When Iron Man and Mandarin escape from Yogthul's dimension, they end up fighting Doom again. Howard then uses one of Doom's own machines to stun Doom as Mandarin claims the 9th Makluan Ring from him. Iron Man then traps Doctor Doom in Yogthul's dimension.
Doctor Doom appears in The Avengers: Earth's Mightiest Heroes, voiced by Lex Lang. He first appears in the second-season premiere "The Private War of Doctor Doom", where he sends Lucia von Bardas and an army of Doombots to attack the Avengers Mansion and Baxter Building, which ended with the capture of Invisible Woman and Wasp. Doom has both heroines placed in a scanner and analyzed as the Avengers and the Fantastic Four make their way towards Latveria. Doctor Doom effortlessly defeats both the Avengers and the three remaining Fantastic Four members when they attempt a rescue. Invisible Woman and Wasp are freed only by Doctor Doom's mercy and as the heroes retreat, Iron Man destroys Doom's scanner. In the final scene, Doctor Doom analyses the data received from the scanner and discovers that "Invisible Woman" was actually a Skrull imposter the whole time. In the episode "Infiltration", Doctor Doom returns, and after a brief confrontation at Stark's mansion, hands him a chip with the ability to scan human beings to see if they are Skrulls or not. Stark asks him if he will help him in the coming fight, but Doom states "that would be beneath" him and leaves. Doctor Doom has a small non-speaking cameo appearance on the episode "Emperor Stark", where he is seen in his throne room being attacked by Iron Man's drones and Thor, who are under the Purple Man's control.
Doctor Doom appears in Ultimate Spider-Man, voiced by Maurice LaMarche. In the episode "Doomed!", Spider-Man, Power Man, Iron Fist, Nova and White Tiger head to Latveria to capture Doctor Doom and prove themselves to Nick Fury, as Doom is at the top of S.H.I.E.L.D.'s most wanted list. When Spider-Man and the other heroes apparently manage to defeat Doom and bring him to Fury, "Doctor Doom" turns out to be a Mark 6 Hoberman Doombot (which contained smaller models in its compartments) programmed to destroy the S.H.I.E.L.D. Helicarrier. Spider-Man and the team manage to defeat the Doombot before it could destroy the Helicarrier's power core. The real Doctor Doom then leaves a transmission, stating that he has scanned their strengths and weaknesses and will be ready for them if they ever cross paths again. In the episode "Not a Toy", Doctor Doom gets a hold of Captain America's shield when it is accidentally thrown off the S.H.I.E.L.D. Helicarrier by Spider-Man and goes right through the Latverian Embassy's window. When Spider-Man tries to argue that the shield is a replica, Doctor Doom does not believe him and launches a heat-seeking missile at him. After avoiding the missile with the help of Captain America, both heroes infiltrate the Latverian Embassy, as Captain America fears that Doom might reverse-engineer his shield's unique properties and become unstoppable. They find out that Doom has been using the Latverian Embassy as a base of operations for a future invasion. Doctor Doom attempts to escape back to Latveria in his jet with Captain America's shield, but Captain America and Spider-Man manage to crash his jet into Central Park. Spider-Man then gets in an argument with Doom, who states he plans to remake the world in his image, but Spider-Man then reveals he's been stalling all along as the S.H.I.E.L.D. Helicarrier arrives. Although he is taken into S.H.I.E.L.D. custody, Doctor Doom claims that his Embassy Officials will have him out by nightfall, and is later deported back to Latveria. Doctor Doom also has cameo appearances, mostly non-speaking, in the episodes "Beetle Mania", "Damage", "I Am Spider-Man", "Sandman Returns" and "New Warriors".
Doctor Doom appears in Avengers Assemble, voiced again by Maurice LaMarche. Doom first makes two non-speaking cameo appearances, first in the episode "The Avengers Protocol, Part 2", briefly seen receiving a holographic message from Red Skull to join his Cabal, and then in the episode "Ghost of a Chance", where he is seen battling the Hulk in a recording. Doctor Doom makes his first full appearance in the episode "The Serpent of Doom", where he manages to obtain Ulik's weapon Codgel (following Ulik's fight against Thor) after intercepting it from some HYDRA agents. Red Skull is not pleased with Doom obtaining the Codgel and contacts him, but Doom states that he is the only one capable of handling the Codgel and does not want to take up Red Skull's offer to join the Cabal. The Avengers track the Codgel's energy signature to the Latverian Embassy to retrieve it. At first they battle his Doombots, but Doctor Doom soon enters the fight and stands toe to toe against Thor. Doom uses the modified Codgel to fulfill the supposed legendary release the Midgard Serpent, with hopes of enslaving it to conquer the globe. After a battle, he and the Midgard Serpent are banished to the Realm Below by the Avengers, using Ulik's extra-dimensional portal. In the episode "The Doomstroyer", Doctor Doom takes control of the Destroyer, which he initially uses to attack the HYDRA and A.I.M. Agents that are in Latveria looking for his weapons cache, and then the Avengers after they confront him. During the fight, Doom mentions how he has seen all of the Asgardian worlds and was able to gain control of the Destroyer, but the effects of controlling the Destroyer start to affect his judgement and causes him to attack his own people and damage Latveria. With help from Loki, Thor, Captain America and Falcon are able to trace Doom to Helheim, where he is using the Helhorn to control the Destroyer and is being guarded by the Midgard Serpent, who he has managed to tame using a special crown. Iron Man is able to get through to Doctor Doom, and as he comes to his senses, his connection to the Destroyer is broken. Captain America then separates Doom from the Helhorn, and he is evacuated from Helheim and returned to Latveria. Doctor Doom then turns down Iron Man's charity offer to help with the relief in Latveria and orders the Avengers to leave, as they have no authority to detain him. In the episode "Planet Doom", Doctor Doom uses his Time Platform to go back in time and prevent the Avengers from forming by altering key events in history, such as preventing Tony Stark's heart from being damaged by bomb shrapnel (so he never becomes Iron Man), saving Bruce Banner from radiation by constructing a special gamma-proof suit (so he never transforms into the Hulk), and leaving Captain America frozen in a block of ice (which Doom makes into an ornament in his throne room). Doom then takes over the world, eliminating all diseases, solving world hunger and ending all conflict. In this new reality, he is served by Black Bride (this reality's version of Black Widow), Bruce Banner, and Tony Stark. When Thor returns to Earth–having been on Asgard and hence unaffected by the changes in history when Doom used the Time Platform–he learns of what happened when he meets the Defenders. After the group is captured, Doctor Doom tries to get Thor to divulge the secrets of Mjolnir. When Thor doesn't cooperate, Doom arranges for their public termination. Before the termination can commence, however, Black Bride takes the opportunity to turn on Doctor Doom as Punisher (who was disguised as an executioner) destroys the Doombots that held the Defenders. In the ensuing battle Doctor Doom apparently kills Thor, but as he tries to lift Mjolnir and fails to do so, Black Bride resuscitates Thor by restarting his heart. The battle frees Captain America from ice, and he helps Banner and Thor to defeat Doom. Thor then uses the Time Platform to go back in time to the moment when Doctor Doom was about to use it for the first time, and secretly destroys it with lightning, making the explosion seem like a project failure. When a Doombot asks if they should recommence with the project, a frustrated Doctor Doom blasts it stating that it was useless, undoing his changes to history. In the episode "The Ambassador", Nick Fury is ordered by his superiors to have S.H.I.E.L.D. and the Avengers protect Doctor Doom while he is speaking at the United Nations, due to the Cabal wanting to kill him after he refused to join them. As Captain America acts as his bodyguard (as he cannot carry any weapons into the UN), Doom is apparently injured as he is attacked by Hyperion, MODOK, Dracula, Attuma and the Red Skull, but it was actually a ploy to get him to Avengers Tower so he could steal their databases and improve his technology using the Avengers'. After making it back to Latveria, he discovers that the information he downloaded was a Trojan Horse program that sent him a transmission from the Avengers, stating that they knew Doctor Doom would try something like this. Iron Man then states to Doom that if he ever leaves Latveria again he will be arrested, as he lost his diplomatic immunity when he attempted to steal his database. The Trojan Horse program then shuts down Doctor Doom's power grid for weeks.
Doctor Doom appears in the Hulk and the Agents of S.M.A.S.H. episode "Red Rover", voiced again by Maurice LaMarche. Doctor Doom ends up capturing Red Hulk when he unknowingly ends up in Latveria as part of his plan to find another location for Devil Dinosaur. Using a larger battlesuit, Doom attempts to absorb Red Hulk's gamma energy, but Devil Dinosaur interferes and frees Red Hulk. They escape from Latveria and arrive back in Vista Verde, but Doctor Doom catches up to them and the Agents of S.M.A.S.H. arrive to join the battle. During the fight, Doom ends up within the Gamma Base and encounters Leader, who offers to team up with him in exchange for freeing him, but Doctor Doom turns down Leader stating that he only teams up with villains on the epic level. With help from Devil Dinosaur, the Agents of S.M.A.S.H. disable Doom's battlesuit and Hulk throws Doctor Doom into the atmosphere. Doctor Doom has a small cameo appearance in the episode "Banner Day", when Betty Ross mentions she used information gathered by top scientists like Tony Stark, Reed Richards, Leader and Doom to develop a serum to revert Hulk back into Bruce Banner, which ends up succeeding.

Film

Live action
 Doctor Doom appears in an unreleased film based on the Fantastic Four which was produced by Roger Corman in 1994, portrayed by Joseph Culp. He was a college classmate of Reed Richards who was nearly killed in an accident when both tried to capture the power of a comet called "the Colossus", but was taken back to Latvaria for "treatment". A decade later the now reborn Doctor Doom kidnapped Alicia Masters and threatened to both kill her and destroy New York as well leading the Fantastic Four traveling to Latvaria to face him. Inside Castle Von Doom, Reed and the others were easily captured by one of Doom's machines, but Richards used his elastic powers to elude the force field which held them captive and used the laser meant to steal their powers against the restraining device. In a battle between old friends, Reed defeats Doom, resulting in Doom falling to his death from Castle Doom despite Reed's attempt to save him.
 Doctor Doom appears in the 2005 film Fantastic Four, portrayed by Julian McMahon. In this version, Victor Von Doom is depicted as a billionaire entrepreneur running Von Doom Industries who has been rivals with Reed Richards since they were science colleagues in high school. As adults, they are rivals for Susan Storm's affections. At the beginning of the film, Reed and Ben Grimm approach Victor and ask him to fund a space mission to study a cosmic storm. Seeing the potential benefits of the project, Victor agreed and reintroduced them to Susan, who was now working as Von Doom's head of genetic research. The four then traveled into space, along with Susan's brother Johnny Storm, on Victor's funded ship which was designed to protect them from the cosmic energy given off by the storm. When the storm entered orbit earlier than expected, Reed, Susan and Johnny attempted to help Ben Grimm, who was exploring outside the ship, while Victor closed the shields to protect himself from the shower of cosmic rays. Upon their return to earth, Reed, Ben, Susan and Johnny all exhibited superhuman powers as a result of the storm. It was eventually revealed that even Victor was exposed to the cosmic dust cloud; he exhibited superhuman strength, electrical and magnetic manipulation, and energy absorption, while the flesh underneath his skin became a durable organic-metallic compound similar to the ship's shields. Seeing the "Fantastic Four" as the only obstacle in his quest for godhood, Victor reverts Ben to his human form, captures Reed, and subdues Johnny. After donning a Latverian metal mask and a green-hooded coat, Victor dubs himself "Doom" and attempts to kill Johnny but fails. Susan tries to reason with Doom but he explained that he came to accept his power and thought himself a kind of god. At first, Victor didn't want to fight but since Susan attacked first, he was fully prepared to kill her, only for Ben (who chose to transform into "The Thing" again) to distract him. The Fantastic Four then combine their efforts to defeat Doom ending with Johnny burning him with supernova temperature (contained by Susan with a force field) and frozen in place by thermal shock when Ben sprayed him with water. His frozen body is later seen in a container on a cargo ship being transported to Latveria. As he’s shipped off, the crew’s electronic devices begins to function erratically indicating that Doom has survived. 
 Doctor Doom returns in the 2007 sequel Fantastic Four: Rise of the Silver Surfer, with Julian McMahon reprising the role. At the beginning of the film, a being known as the Silver Surfer enters earth's atmosphere and soars over Victor Von Doom's castle in Hassenstadt, Latveria, 'awakening' Doom with the residual cosmic energy given off by his board. After Doom monitors the mysterious entity's movements, he tracks the Surfer down in Greenland and attempts to form an alliance with him. Outraged by the Cosmic Herald's refusal, Doom electrocutes him, causing the Surfer to attack but inadvertently heal Doom's scars and skin damage, though he retained his electrical powers. Deceiving both the Fantastic Four and the military, Doom aids them in capturing the Surfer by using a tachyon pulse to separate him from his board. During his time working with the Four, Doom secretly builds a gauntlet that will link him with the Surfer's board. After the Surfer and the Four are contained in a Siberian military base, Doom dons a suit of carved armor, a green cloak and a new mask before using the gauntlet to take control of the Surfer's board. Doom then uses his new powers to kill most of the soldiers in the base. After battling the Four and the Surfer, they end up in Shanghai, where he impales Susan with a cosmic spear. After her brief death, Johnny Storm (who was also affected by the Surfer's cosmic energy) absorbs the powers of his teammates and confronts Doom, separating him from the board. Ben Grimm then uses a crane from a nearby construction site to hit and send Doom flying into a nearby harbor, causing him to sink in the water. It’s not revealed if he survived or drowned. 
 Victor Von Doom appears in the 2015 film Fantastic Four, portrayed by Toby Kebbell, where he is known simply as "Doom".  It was initially reported that the film's version of the character would be called Victor Domashev, but the character was not named so in the film. In the film, Victor Von Doom is an anti-social computer programmer and former scientist that works for the Baxter Foundation and is mentored by Dr. Franklin Storm. He reluctantly agreed to complete the Quantam Gate along with Reed Richards, Johnny Storm, and Susan Storm, because of his unrequited love for Susan. Due to not being chosen to participate in the first expedition, Richards recruits Johnny, Victor, and a reluctant Ben Grimm to go on an unsanctioned voyage to a dimension called Planet Zero. During their trip, Victor attempts to touch the planet's green liquid-like substance, which inadvertently causes the structure or the area to collapse and the ground began to erupt the substance. Doom was seemingly killed when he fell into the collapsing surface, not before having some of the erupting green substance to fall on him, and seemingly mutate him. This forces Reed, Ben, and Johnny to leave him and return to Earth, but not before an accident occurs that gives the three survivors and Susan Storm unique superhuman abilities. One year later, Dr. Franklin Storm sends a team to explore Planet Zero, where it is revealed that Doom survived and has been living on Planet Zero ever since. However, the green lava that he fell into permanently fused his spacesuit to his body, as well as granting him telekinetic powers and force field projection, along with the ability to control Planet Zero's elements. He is brought back to Earth, where he is questioned by Dr. Harvey Allen. Believing that they want to sabotage his new home world that's keeping him alive, Doom reveals his plan to destroy Earth so Planet Zero can live on, free from human interference. He then escapes and heads back to Planet Zero, but not before killing Dr. Harvey Allen and dozens of other innocent people. Dr. Storm tries to talk reason with him, but Victor refuses to listen and kills him. Reed, Ben, Johnny and Susan then follow him, where he activates a portal that begins to destroy Earth. After a brief confrontation, Grimm punches Doom into the portal's energy beam, disintegrating him and closing the portal.
 A Doctor Doom origin film was in development, with Noah Hawley attached to direct. In an interview with ScreenGeek, Mads Mikkelsen has expressed interest in playing the character, having previously auditioned for Doctor Doom for the 2015 film. In August 2019, Hawley told Deadline that the film is "done". In October 2019, following the acquisition of 21st Century Fox by Disney, Hawley revealed the film is "in limbo", due to Kevin Feige's plans to incorporate the character, alongside the Fantastic Four, into the Marvel Cinematic Universe.

Animated
 Doctor Doom appears in the animated 4D film Marvel Super Heroes 4D, voiced by Paul Dobson.

Literature
Doctor Doom serves as the initial villain in the Chaos Engine trilogy, which opens with the revelation that Doom has rewritten history so that he is now the ruler of the world, having defeated other villains such as the Mandarin, married to Storm and hunting Magneto as his arch-enemy. Fortunately, a group of X-Men were outside reality when this rewrite occurred and are dispatched to investigate, which leads to them and the "local" Betsy Braddock (her memories restored by Jean Grey) learning that Doom created this reality through a Cosmic Cube. However, this cube turns out to be flawed in two ways; not only does use of it to maintain this new world drain the user's life-force so that Doom now appears to be in his eighties or older, but he didn't actually change the history of his world but just "superimposed" another Earth's history onto it. After Psylocke takes him out of reality after Magneto acquires the Cube, Doom is restored to his rightful age and attempts to stage a coup in the Starlight Citadel, only to be opposed by the X-Men and Magneto. He is ultimately returned to Earth with his knowledge of how to access the Citadel or create a new Cube removed so that he cannot attempt such a scheme again.

Podcast
 The Marvel's Wastelanders podcast series features a version of the Old Man Logan Dr. Doom and his Doombots, both voiced by Dylan Baker. Doom is first mentioned in the 2021 Marvel's Wasterlanders: Star-Lord series, which takes place in Doomwood, a section the American West under the control of Dr. Doom and heavily policed by Doombots. Doom himself makes an appearance in the series' final episode. In September 2022, the 10-episode series Marvel's Wastelanders: Doom began, with Baker returning to voice Doom. The series picks up where Marvel's Wastelanders: Star-Lord ended and follows Doom as he teams up with Valeria Richards to seek revenge on those who betrayed him on V-Day.

Video games

Doctor Doom's first appearance in video games was as the final boss in Paragon Software's computer game The Amazing Spider-Man and Captain America in Dr. Doom's Revenge! (1989).
Doctor Doom appears as one of the main antagonists in Sega's arcade game Spider-Man: The Video Game (1991). In this game, Spider-Man and his allies must retrieve a mystical artifact from first the Kingpin, then Doctor Doom.
Doctor Doom appeared in most games created by Capcom:
Doctor Doom is featured as a boss character in Capcom's fighting game Marvel Super Heroes (1995), voiced by Lorne Kennedy. He becomes playable after the game is beaten once and a code is entered.
Doctor Doom appears as a boss in Capcom's platform game Marvel Super Heroes In War of the Gems (1996) for the Super NES.
Doom returns as a selectable character in Capcom's Marvel vs. Capcom 2: New Age of Heroes (2000), again voiced by Lorne Kennedy. He is particularly notorious for the so-called Strider/Doctor Doom trap.
Doctor Doom returns as a playable character in Capcom's Marvel vs. Capcom 3: Fate of Two Worlds (2011), with Paul Dobson reprising his role from Fantastic Four: World's Greatest Heroes. He is one of the key characters in the game's plot, in which he joins forces with Albert Wesker from Resident Evil to unite the Marvel and Capcom worlds so he can conquer both. He reappears as a playable fighter in the game's updated version Ultimate Marvel vs. Capcom 3.
Doctor Doom appears as a boss in Acclaim Entertainment's beat 'em up Fantastic Four (1997) for the PlayStation. In this game, Doom develops a device that transports the Fantastic Four (and She-Hulk) to various locations around the planet to do battle with monsters and supervillains. Mister Fantastic is able to assemble a time machine that allows him to transport the team to Doom's lair for a final battle. The Fantastic Four defeats him and his castle is destroyed.
Doctor appears as one of the bosses in the games based on two of Fantastic Four films:
Doctor Doom appears as the final boss in Activision's beat 'em up action-adventure video game Fantastic Four (2005), based on the Fantastic Four film. Julian McMahon voices Doom, reprising his role from the movie. The game expands the character's role from the film. Just like in the movie, Victor von Doom sponsors and joins the space expedition that gives the Fantastic Four their powers, also being affected by the cosmic storm, having his body slowly transformed into metal and gaining the ability to manipulate electricity. Vengeful, Doom sends a squadron of his Doombots to attack the Fantastic Four at Times Square. Doctor Doom later heads to the Baxter Building, where he steals The Thing's powers using Reed's transformation chamber and defeats the other three members of the Fantastic Four. However, the Thing recovers his powers by re-entering the transformation chamber and saves his friends by battling Doom. The Fantastic Four then combines their powers and are able to defeat Doctor Doom by freezing him. Jim Meskimen voices Doom in bonus unlockable levels where the Fantastic Four prevent him from launching a missile.
Doctor Doom appears in 2K Games's action-adventure video game Fantastic Four: Rise of the Silver Surfer (2007), voiced by Gideon Emery. He plays a bigger role in the game than in the film as after he acquires the Silver Surfer's powers, he intends to use them to fight Galactus and save Earth (though he only does this so he can conquer it afterwards). Unlike the film, he builds a machine to strip Galactus of most of his cosmic power for himself but the Fantastic Four use his machine against him to defeat him.
Doctor Doom is an exclusive playable character for the PSP version of Electronic Arts' fighting game Marvel Nemesis: Rise of the Imperfects (2005).
Doctor Doom is a recurring character in every Marvel: Ultimate Alliance series:
Doctor Doom is the main antagonist and final boss of Activision's action role-playing video game Marvel: Ultimate Alliance (2006), voiced by Clive Revill. In the game's storyline, Doom leads the Masters of Evil and manages to steal the powers of Odin. With these Godlike powers, Doom conquers the Earth, corrupting and creating clones of the superheroes that attempt to defeat him. The remaining heroes eventually manage to free Odin and weaken Doctor Doom, who is blasted by a bolt of lightning sent by a rejuvenated Odin, leaving nothing but his mask behind. Odin then uses his powers to restore the Earth, fixing the damage caused by Doom. Doctor Doom was an exclusive playable character for the Xbox 360 version of the game, available only by downloadable content. He was later included in the 2016 re-release for PlayStation 4, Xbox One and PC. When playing with Doom, special dialogue clarifies that the Doom the player is controlling is the Doctor Doom of the present, while the enemy Doom is from the future. The playable Doom has special dialogue with Winter Soldier and Radioactive Man, and a glitched special dialogue with Ymir.
Both a statue of Doctor Doom, as well as an informative dossier about him, can be found in the Latveria level in the sequel Marvel: Ultimate Alliance 2 (2009). He is also mentioned by several characters in the game. In particular, Thor explains that Doom and Loki are still being punished by Odin for their crimes during the events of the previous game.
Doctor Doom returns as a playable antagonist for the DLC storyline “Shadow of Doom” depicted in Marvel: Ultimate Alliance 3 (2019), voiced by Maurice LaMarche. Doom is the fifth playable character within the Fantastic Four DLC pack. After the heroes' war against Thanos is over, Doom assaults Wakanda to steal the Soul Stone and transport the heroes into the Negative Zone, where they are attacked by Annihilus' army and rescued by the Fantastic Four. It is also revealed that Doom also left Fantastic Four stranded at the Negative Zone, when he was chased by them across dimensions, sometimes prior to the heroes’ war against Thanos. Doom uses the Soul Stone to transform into a God Emperor, having taken his people's souls and awakened one of the Celestials. After Doom is defeated and all Latverian citizens return, Mr. Fantastic reveals that what Doom has been doing is noble, but too twisted to do it himself to save the Earth. Both scientists learned from their time absences from the war against Thanos that, as a result from Thanos' suicide clash with his fallen son Thane, somehow unleashes the worst threat which is about to destroy their universe soon. Eventually, Doom joins the alliance to stop this new threat.
Doctor Doom appears in THQ's beat 'em up Marvel Super Hero Squad (2009), voiced by Charlie Adler, reprising his role from the animated series. His regular, Ultimate and Professor versions appear.
Doctor Doom appears in the Fantastic Four virtual pinball game for Pinball FX 2 (2010) released by Zen Studios.
Doctor Doom appears in the Marvel Super Hero Squad: The Infinity Gauntlet video game, again voiced by Charlie Adler.
Doctor Doom appears as a villain character in Marvel Super Hero Squad Online, once again voiced by Charlie Adler. He also appears as a playable character in his original and Future Foundation outfits.
Doctor Doom appears in the Marvel Super Hero Squad: Comic Combat video game, once again voiced by Charlie Adler.
Doctor Doom is a playable character in the Facebook game Marvel: Avengers Alliance. He was originally featured as a boss before being made available to players.
Doctor Doom appears as a playable character in the 2012 fighting game Marvel Avengers: Battle for Earth, voiced by Fred Tatasciore.
Doctor Doom is available as downloadable content for the game LittleBigPlanet, as part of "Marvel Costume Kit 6".
Doctor Doom was a playable character, a non-playable team-up character, as well as an enemy and the story's primary antagonist in the MMORPG Marvel Heroes, with Lex Lang reprising his role from Avengers: Earth's Mightiest Heroes.
Doctor Doom appears as a playable character and a boss in Lego Marvel Super Heroes, voiced again by Fred Tatasciore. In the game's story, he attacks Silver Surfer, shattering his board into multiple "Cosmic Bricks." He then hires various villains to retrieve the bricks for him, allowing him and Loki to build the "Doom Ray of Doom" to defeat Galactus, who is approaching Earth, and then take over the world. However, after the heroes defeat Doom (who was mind-controlled by Loki at the time) aboard Asteroid M, Loki reveals that he tricked Doom into building a flying pod that will allow him to mind control Galactus and destroy both Earth and Asgard. Afterwards, Doom reluctantly joins forces with the heroes to combat this new threat, ultimately defeating Loki and Galactus and sending them through a portal and into an unknown location in space. Doom and the other villains who aided in saving Earth are then given a head start by the heroes to evade capture. His only ability is electricity and hack computers while his ability to fly and use of sorcery is adapted out.
Doctor Doom is an unlockable character in Marvel Avengers Alliance Tactics.
Doctor Doom is a playable character in the mobile game Marvel: Future Fight.
Doctor Doom is a playable character in the mobile game Marvel Contest of Champions.
Doctor Doom is an unlockable outfit in Fortnite Battle Royale Chapter 2, Season 4, titled "Nexus War".
 Doctor Doom appears as a collectible card in the Digital Collectible Card Game Marvel Snap.
Doctor Doom makes a cameo in the Marvel's Midnight Suns; though his full appearance is not revealed. He finds the Darkhold still intact after Lillith tried to destroy it. Taking the book, he deems Lillith and Hiram Shaw "amateurs" for how they used its magic.

In the DLC, Doom hires Deadpool to steal back a statue Sin had taken on Dracula's order.

Live performances
 Doctor Doom was one of the characters portrayed in the 1987 live adaptation of the Spider-Man and Mary Jane wedding performed at Shea Stadium.

References

Fantastic Four in other media
Doctor Doom